The 2015 Copa do Nordeste was the 12th edition of the main football tournament featuring teams from the Brazilian Northeast Region. The competition featured 20 clubs, with Bahia and Pernambuco having three seeds each, and Ceará, Rio Grande do Norte, Sergipe, Alagoas, Paraíba, Maranhão and Piauí with two seeds each. For the first time, the competition included teams from Maranhão and Piauí.

Qualified teams

Knockout phase

Bracket

Quarterfinals

|}

Semifinals

|}

Finals

Top scorers

References

Copa do Nordeste